Peter Mahne (born 2 March 1959) is a Slovenian handball player. He competed in the men's tournament at the 1980 Summer Olympics.

References

External links
 

1959 births
Living people
Slovenian male handball players
Olympic handball players of Yugoslavia
Handball players at the 1980 Summer Olympics
Handball players from Ljubljana